recordMyDesktop is a free and open source desktop screencasting software application written for Linux.

The program is separated into two parts; a command line tool called recordmydesktop, licensed under GPL-2.0-or-later, that performs the tasks of capturing and encoding, and front-ends that exposes the program functionality graphically.

There are two front-ends written in Python: gtk-recordmydesktop which is licensed under GPL-2.0-or-later, and qt-recordymydesktop which is licensed under GPL-3.0-or-later.

recordMyDesktop also offers the ability to record audio through ALSA, OSS or the JACK audio server. RecordMyDesktop only outputs to Ogg using Theora for video and Vorbis for audio.

See also 

Comparison of screencasting software
Screencast
SimpleScreenRecorder

References

External links
 
 
 

Free software programmed in C
Free video software
Screencasting software